From May to September in 1878, an Australian cricket team made the inaugural first-class tour of England by a representative overseas side. In October, the Australians played additional matches in the US and Canada on their return journey. The tour followed one made by an England team to Australia in 1876–77, during which the first matches retrospectively given Test match status were played. None of the 1878 matches had international status, nevertheless the tour proved to be such an outstanding financial and sporting success that the future of international cricket was assured.

The Australian team was managed by John Conway and captained by Dave Gregory. William Gibbes, who was a non-player, acted as the team's assistant-manager and secretary. Conway was a journalist from Geelong, Victoria while Gregory and Gibbes were both Sydney-based accountants working for the New South Wales Public Service. These three cricket enthusiasts were the architects of the venture. They and the players each contributed the sum of £50 to finance the expedition and later shared equally in the handsome profits that their enterprise generated, having carted the match takings around with them in a closely guarded strong-box all the time that they were away.

Gregory demonstrated excellent leadership and tactical skills throughout the long tour, while Fred Spofforth became the star performer of the team. Cricket scholars consider him to have been one of the greatest fast bowlers in the history of the game.

Preliminaries
During the English tour of Australia in 1876–77, the Australian all-rounder and impresario John Conway met the English captain James Lillywhite in Melbourne and discussed the potential profitability of an Australian team visiting England. Lillywhite agreed to take soundings at home and see if the major English teams would consider hosting a team of "the best cricketers in the colonies". During the 1877 English season, Lillywhite made enquiries and was encouraged by the feedback. He contacted Conway to report interest and, with the possibility of "good money", offered to arrange a fixture list. Conway negotiated with Dave Gregory who had captained the "Combined XI from Sydney and Melbourne" against Lillywhite's professionals in what latterly became recognised as the first two Test matches. It was agreed that the players would form a private company by contributing £50 each to cover expenses, profits to be shared accordingly although Conway as manager would take 7.5% of gross proceeds.

They then traveled across America by train, a potentially hazardous undertaking in the era of the James–Younger Gang and others, though Frank and Jesse James were still in hiding after the abortive Northfield Raid in 1876. The team caught the train to Nottingham and arrived there at 12:15 on 14 May to a large reception. On 20 May, they began their first match at Trent Bridge against Nottinghamshire.

Touring party
The Australian party was composed of: J. Conway (Victoria; manager), W. C. V. Gibbes (assistant-manager), D. W. Gregory (New South Wales; captain), F. E. Allan (Victoria), G. H. Bailey (Tasmania), A. C. Bannerman (New South Wales), C. Bannerman (New South Wales), J. McC. Blackham (Victoria; wicket-keeper), H. F. Boyle (Victoria), T. W. Garrett (New South Wales), T. P. Horan (Victoria), W. E. Midwinter (Victoria), W. L. Murdoch (New South Wales) and F. R. Spofforth (New South Wales). Midwinter was already in England and joined the team in Nottingham for their opening game.

Matches and incidents
27 May. MCC versus Australians at Lord's. The Australians established their reputation for all time by a nine wicket victory inside five hours in one of the most sensational games in history. A strong MCC team, led by W. G. Grace himself, was bowled out for 33 (Spofforth 6–4, including a hat trick) and though they in turn dismissed the Aussies for 41 (Shaw 5–10, Morley 5-31), MCC in their second innings were out for just 19 (Boyle 5–3, Spofforth 5–16). The Australians needed 12 to win, which was a substantial total in the conditions, but they lost only their star batsman Charles Bannerman in getting them. Spofforth's match analysis was 14.3 overs, five maidens, 20 runs, 11 wickets. This match inspired Punch to publish the following verse:

The Australians came down like a wolf on the fold,
The Marylebone cracks for a trifle were bowled;
Our Grace before dinner was very soon done, 
And Grace after dinner did not get a run.

20 – 22 June. Middlesex versus Australians at Lord's and Surrey versus Gloucestershire at The Oval. Shortly before play was due to begin at Lord's, WG Grace and others of the Gloucestershire camp turned up and effectively "nabbed" Billy Midwinter, taking him to the Oval to play for Gloucestershire. Midwinter had played for them in 1877 and Grace argued that he was bound to continue if required. Since Gloucestershire had arrived at the Oval with only ten players, Midwinter most definitely was required.

A dispute ensued and all sorts of agreements and contractual arrangements were argued over. It seems that WG was at first rude and insulting, then tried to brazen it out before offering a guarded apology and eventually getting around to his favourite topic: money. Midwinter apparently did quite well out of it all despite being anything but an innocent party. The Aussies got some satisfaction when they beat Middlesex by 98 runs without Midwinter while Gloucestershire, with Midwinter, lost by 16 runs to Surrey. But the real revenge came later.

5 – 6 Sept. Gloucestershire versus Australians (Clifton College). Australians won by 10 wkts. This was the champion county's only home defeat of the season.  All three Graces were playing but not Midwinter. Aussie revenge was complete thanks to a 12-90 match haul by the Demon, though he did not get WG's wicket.

11 – 12 Sept. Players versus Australians at Prince's Ground ended the Australian tour and was also the last time Prince's Ground (in Chelsea) was used as a first-class venue, Middlesex having moved to Lord's in 1877.

Tour itinerary

North American leg of the tour

They arrived in New York over a week later and went on to Philadelphia where they played the Philadelphian cricket team on 3–5 October at the Germantown Ground. This match, which is now unofficially rated first-class, was disrupted by disputes and walk-offs before it ended in a draw. The tourists played five other games, all minor fixtures, in Hoboken, Toronto, Montreal, St Louis and San Francisco.

Ancillary note: In San Francisco, the Australian team had played a California XXII side composed of members from the Occidental and Oakland Cricket Clubs. The Oakland club was the first cricket team established on the East Bay, which became home to several cricket teams between 1878 and 1913. This was the first time a California side played an Australian national side.

Aftermath of the Midwinter incident
Meanwhile, back in England, the Graces endured months of controversy about the payments they received as supposed amateurs, much of which had come to light as a result of the Midwinter affair. Charges were brought against them at a stormy meeting of the Gloucestershire club's members and they were vilified in the press. In the end, little came of it. The Graces had too much influence. WG was simply too popular to be challenged and EM as a coroner was seen to be a "pillar of the community". So, although their ears burned, they escaped censure and nothing much changed.

See also
 Australian cricket team in New Zealand in 1877–78
 1878 English cricket season
 W. G. Grace in the 1878 English cricket season

References

External sources
 CricketArchive – season summaries
 "Argus", The Australian Cricketers' Tour through Australia, New Zealand and Great Britain, Jarrett & Co., Sydney, 1878

Annual reviews
 James Lillywhite's Cricketers' Annual (Red Lilly) 1879 
 John Lillywhite's Cricketer's Companion (Green Lilly) 1879 
 Wisden Cricketers' Almanack 1879

Sources
 Derek Birley, A Social History of English Cricket, Aurum, 1999
 Chris Harte, A History of Australian Cricket, Andre Deutsch, 1993
 
 
 Jack Pollard, The Complete Illustrated History of Australian Cricket, revised edition, Viking, 1995

1878 in American sports
1878 in Australian cricket
1878 in English cricket
1878
1878
Canadian cricket in the 19th century
English cricket seasons in the 19th century
International cricket competitions from 1844 to 1888
United States cricket in the 19th century
1878 in Canadian sports